Ferenc Obreczán (born January 21, 1950) is a Hungarian politician, member of the National Assembly (MP) from Fidesz Pest County Regional List between 2010 and 2014.

Obreczán became deputy mayor of his birthplace, Verseg in 2003. He was elected general secretary of the National Alliance of Hungarian Farmers (MAGOSZ) in 2004. He participated in the organizing of farmers' demonstration between February and March 2005. He became a member of the General Assembly of Pest County during the 2006 local elections.

He was a member of the Committee on Agriculture from May 14, 2010 to May 5, 2014.

References

1950 births
Living people
Fidesz politicians
Members of the National Assembly of Hungary (2010–2014)
People from Pest County